In discussion of science fiction, a Big Dumb Object (BDO) is any mysterious object, usually of extraterrestrial or unknown origin and immense power, in a story which generates an intense sense of wonder by its mere existence. To a certain extent, the term deliberately deflates this.

The term was not in general use until Peter Nicholls included it in The Encyclopedia of Science Fiction as a joke in 1993, while its creation has been attributed to reviewer Roz Kaveney.

Big Dumb Objects often exhibit extreme or unusual properties, or a total absence of some expected properties:

 The monolith in Stanley Kubrick and Arthur C. Clarke's 2001: A Space Odyssey (foreshadowed in The Sentinel) is an indecipherable influence on the protohumans to whom it first appears, and later in the film serves to show how little humans have evolved.  Astronaut Bowman's attempt to interact with the monolith only makes him a part of its mystery.

 In Arthur C. Clarke's novel Rendezvous with Rama, a 50km-long cylinder is detected entering the solar system. A similar cylindrical probe of gargantuan dimensions threatens Earth in Star Trek IV: The Voyage Home.
The object discovered in Quatermass and the Pit was made of a material of extreme hardness, such that diamond-tipped drills and acetylene torches would not damage it. At the same time nothing would adhere to it.

 Charles Sheffield's Heritage Universe setting features many immense alien artifacts, some of which are more inscrutable than others.

 The Marker from Dead Space emits a persistent electromagnetic field from seemingly no source, which could be used to provide limitless energy. Attempting to reverse engineer the Marker, scientists discover that the electromagnetic fields generated by the Marker cause living people to suffer paranoia and hallucinations, while also causing the dead to reanimate, becoming "Necromorphs".

 In the movie based on Michael Crichton's novel Sphere, the eponymous object would reflect everything in its presence except people. If it did reflect someone, she or he was alone, and the individual was accepted as worthy to harness the device's power.

 In Iain Banks' novel Against a Dark Background, the Lazy Guns have a lot of mass and yet little weight, and weigh three times as much upside-down as upright.
 By the same author, the titular Excession is a blackbody sphere that appears on the edge of Culture space and just sits there being inscrutable (even to Culture technology).

 The dome from the Stephen King novel and television show Under the Dome is large and transparent unless touched by a person; it gives a slight electric shock when touched for the first time by someone, but not afterward. It cannot be penetrated, even by a MOAB bomb, and is seemingly causing many mysterious events in Chester's Mill, the town that the dome is enclosing, including causing all electronic devices near it to explode, visions, and, in one character, premature birth. 

 In Dan Simmons' 1989 novel Hyperion, the mysterious Time Tombs, "huge brooding structures" which are moving backwards through time, and whose purpose, origin, and nature are not explained in the book, are the objective of the characters' pilgrimage.

Such unexpected properties are usually used to rule out conventional origins for the BDO and increase the sense of mystery, and even fear, for the characters interacting with it.

See also
 Dyson sphere
 MacGuffin
 Megastructure
 Ringworld

References

External links 
 Big Dumb Objects at The Encyclopedia of Science Fiction, 3rd edition

1993 neologisms
Fictional objects
Narratology
Science fiction themes